The 3rd constituency of Guadeloupe is a French legislative constituency in
Guadeloupe, an insular region of France located in the Leeward Islands.

Since 2017, it is represented by Max Mathiasin an unaligned left wing (Miscellaneous left) deputy.

Deputies

Election results

2022

2017

2012

Sources

Official results of French elections from 2002: "Résultats électoraux officiels en France" (in French).

3